

Seasons

References

External links

broncosports.com – Official Boise State Broncos football website

Boise State Broncos
Boise State Broncos football seasons